The 1993 World Taekwondo Championships were the 11th edition of the World Taekwondo Championships, and were held in New York City, United States from August 19 to August 21, 1993, with 669 athletes participating from 83 countries.

The success of the 1993 World Championships was a determining factor in the IOC's decision to grant full medal status to Taekwondo for the 2000 Summer Olympics.

Medal summary

Men

Women

Medal table

References

WTF Medal Winners 

World
Taekwondo Championships
World Taekwondo Championships
Taekwondo Championships
Taekwondo competitions in the United States